Triphosphono phosphate is the simplest branched polyphosphoric acid. It is a hexaprotic acid.
It is used to prepare phosphoric monoesters.

References

Phosphates